= Đakonović =

Đakonović (Serbian Cyrillic: Ђаконовић; also transliterated Djakonović) is a Serbo-Croatian surname, derived from the word đakon meaning "deacon". It may refer to:

- Luka Đakonović, Yugoslav mayor of Ulcinj
- Vasilije Đakonović, Yugoslav mayor of Ulcinj
- Nikola Đakonović, historian
- Nikola Đakonović, Yugoslav minister of finance
- Dragan Đakonović, musician
